The Maine Bureau of Motor Vehicles (BMV) is based in Augusta, Maine's capital. Branch offices are located throughout the state. The BMV is part of the Department of the Secretary of State. They qualify and license drivers, and maintain records of driver history, as well as vehicle ownership and regulation. They also provide funding for building and maintaining the state's highways. The bureau was made in 1905 based on concern from the recently made motor vehicles.

Locations 
The main branch is in Augusta, however there are other branches and locations for the BMW.

For Motor Vehicle Branch Office Locations, there are locations for these communities:

 Augusta
 Bangor
 Calais
 Caribou
 Ellsworth
 Kennebunk
 Lewiston
 Portland
 Rockland
 Rumford
 Scarborough
 Springvale
 Topsham

See also
Department of Motor Vehicles
Government of Maine

References

External links
Maine Bureau of Motor Vehicles

Transportation in Maine
Motor Vehicles
Motor vehicle registration agencies